Her Hour is a lost 1917 silent film drama directed by George Cowl and starring Kitty Gordon. It was produced and released by the World Film Company.

Cast
Kitty Gordon - Rita Castle
George Morgan - Tom Castle
George MacQuarrie - Ralph Christie
Frank Beamish - Val Clement
Yolande Brown - Mrs. Trent
Edmund Burns - Dick Christie(*as Edward Burns)
Lillian Cook - Alicia
Justine Cutting - Mrs. Duggan
Eric Mayne - Phidias Trent
Jean Wilson - Trent's Daugh

References

External links

1917 films
American silent feature films
Lost American films
World Film Company films
American black-and-white films
Silent American drama films
1917 drama films
1917 lost films
Lost drama films
1910s American films